Accept is the debut studio album released by German heavy metal band Accept. It was recorded in 1978 and released in early 1979 on the German label Brain Records. Drums on the record are played by Frank Friedrich, but he chose not to pursue a professional music career and so his place was taken by Stefan Kaufmann just prior to the album's release. Bassist Peter Baltes performs lead vocals on "Seawinds" and "Sounds of War".

Guitarist Wolf Hoffmann later remembered the debut as simply a collection of songs the band had worked up over their formative years, with no real focus: "We were just playing songs that we had always played. It was material that had gathered up over the first few months and years of our existence and it was a mixture of all kinds of stuff." He also recalls it selling around 3,000 copies. Lead vocalist Udo Dirkschneider expressed dissatisfaction with the group's first effort looking back on it: "Naturally, it was very exciting for us the first time we entered a recording studio but also disappointing at the same time." Accept would gain better production values and a more cohesive direction on future releases, but the debut was an important early step that gained them the ability to play the neighbouring countries of Belgium, the Netherlands and France for the first time.

Swedish metal band Therion covered "Seawinds" on Crowning of Atlantis (1999)

Track listing

Note
 A Russian edition released by Fono Ltd. in 2017 contains a spoken commentary track by Udo Dirkschneider talking about the early years of the band.

Credits
Band members
Udo Dirkschneider – vocals
Wolf Hoffmann – lead guitar
Jörg Fischer – rhythm and lead guitar
Peter Baltes – bass, vocals 
Frank Friedrich – drums

Production
Frank Martin – producer for Delta Studio Productions
René Tinner, Manfred Schunke – engineers, mixing
Jacques Sehy – photography
Alster-Atelier, Hamburg – cover design
The motor-saw was provided by Fichtel & Sachs
Published by Oktave, Hamburg

References

Accept (band) albums
1979 debut albums
Brain Records albums